Robert Neil "Rob" Denmark (born 23 November 1968) is a British former middle- and long-distance runner who won a gold medal in the 5000 metres at the 1994 Commonwealth Games, a silver medal in the 5000 metres at the 1994 European Championships, and a bronze medal in the 3000 metres at the 1991 IAAF World Indoor Championships. A two-time Olympian, he finished seventh in the 5000 metres final at the 1992 Barcelona Olympics.

Career
Born in Billericay, Denmark began his international career by winning a bronze medal in the 3000 metres at the 1991 World Indoor Championships. A year later, he achieved his lifetime best in the 5000m with 13:10.24 at the Rome Grand Prix on 9 June, a time that still ranks him sixth on the UK all-time list (as of 2017). Two months later at the 1992 Barcelona Olympics, he finished seventh in the 5000 metres final. He also finished ninth in the 5000m finals at the 1991 and 1993 World Championships. In 1994, he won a silver medal in the 5000m at the European Championships behind Olympic champion Dieter Baumann, before going on to win the 5000m title at the Commonwealth Games a month later.

Denmark went on to compete at three more World Championships (1995–99), and in the 10,000m at the 2000 Sydney Olympics, without reaching the finals. He concluded his international career by competing at the 2002 Commonwealth Games.

Denmark attended Furtherwick Park School, on Canvey Island, and represented Basildon Athletic Club. He is still involved with athletics as a coach.

International competitions

Personal bests
1500 m – 3:37.99 (1995)
Mile – 3:55.38 (1990)
3000 m – 7:39.55 (1993)
5000 m – 13:10.24 (1992)
10,000 m – 28:03.31 (2000)

References

 
 Robert Denmark at British Olympic Committee
 
 Rob Denmark at The Power of Ten
 Rob Denmark at Sporting-Heroes.net

External links
 

1968 births
Living people
British male middle-distance runners
British male long-distance runners
Athletes (track and field) at the 1992 Summer Olympics
Athletes (track and field) at the 1994 Commonwealth Games
Athletes (track and field) at the 2000 Summer Olympics
Athletes (track and field) at the 2002 Commonwealth Games
Commonwealth Games gold medallists for England
Olympic athletes of Great Britain
Sportspeople from Basildon
People from Canvey Island
European Athletics Championships medalists
Commonwealth Games medallists in athletics
British athletics coaches
Medallists at the 1994 Commonwealth Games